"Doucement" is a French-language song by Makassy (real name Alrick Kalala), a French soccer player of Congolese origin previously playing in AS Vitré and a singer. The song, his first charting single, was co-written by Kalala himself with Tarik Hamiche and produced by Hamiche, Cédric Lokamba and Christian Kayombo Tambwé. A music video was also released through We Made it Entertainment.

Track list
"Doucement" (radio edit) – 3:20
"Doucement" (remix Soleil) – 3:46
"Doucement" (remix Latino) – 4:24
"Doucement" (club extended) – 4:04
"Doucement" (remix Reggaeton) – 3:15
"Doucement" (Makassy Sensual mix 2015) – 3:26

Charts

References

French-language songs
2015 singles
2015 songs